Niekerk may refer to:

In Groningen, Netherlands:
 Niekerk, Het Hogeland, a village in the municipality of Het Hogeland
 Niekerk, Westerkwartier, a village in the municipality of Westerkwartier

People with the surname 
 Maurits Niekerk (1871–1940), Dutch painter

See also 
 Van Niekerk